Char Kolmi Union is a union parishad in Char Fasson Upazila of Bhola District, in Barisal Division, Bangladesh.

Geography
The area of Char Kolmi Union is 8,443 acres.

Demographics
According to the 2011 census, the total population of Char Kolmi Union is 19,419 Of these, 9,588 are males and 9,831 are females. The total number of families is 3,954.

Administration
Char Kolmi Union is a union of Char Fasson Upazila. Administrative activities of this union are under Char Fasson police Station. It is part of Bhola-4 constituency 118 of the National Assembly.

Education
According to the 2011 census, Char Kolmi Union has an average literacy rate of 36.9%.

References

Unions of Char Fasson Upazila
Populated places in Bhola District